Hillcrest High School is public high school near Tuscaloosa, Alabama, United States.  The school is located in the unincorporated suburban area south of Tuscaloosa informally known as Taylorville.  The school is administered by the Tuscaloosa County School System under the authority of the Alabama State Department of Education.

Athletics
In 2019, Hillcrest's baseball team is ranked number 1 in class 6A.

Notable alumni
 Tim Anderson, baseball player
 Brandon Medders, Former MLB player (Arizona Diamondbacks, San Francisco Giants)
 D.J. White, Former NBA Player, currently for the Fujian Sturgeons of the Chinese Basketball Association
 Brian Robinson Jr., running back for the Washington Commanders

References

http://www.tcss.net/hillcresths

External links

Tuscaloosa County School System website

Public high schools in Alabama
Educational institutions established in 1982
Schools in Tuscaloosa County, Alabama
1982 establishments in Alabama